Inaruwa (Nepali: इनरुवा) is a vibrant and bustling city located in Koshi province of Nepal. Established as a Municipality in 2047 BS, it operates under a mayor-council type of government and is currently led by Mayor Kedar Bhandari. Spanning 77.92 square kilometers, this Municipality is home to a population of nearly 75 thousand residents. With a rich cultural heritage, strong community spirit and a commitment to progress.

Inaruwa Municipality is a district headquarters of Sunsari District under Koshi province  of Nepal. Former VDCs like Babiya , Madhesa, Dumraha, Jalpapur , Chandbela were merged into a  municipality . According to the geographical demarcation, the name of the town is Inaruwa, surrounded by Gadhi Municipality in the east, Bhokraha rural Municipality in the west, Itahari Sub-metropolitan Municipality and Ramdhuni Municipality in the north and Harinagar Municipality in the south. The municipality is politically divided into 10 wards. Inaruwa is one of the six municipalities in the district, while Ramdhuni, Duhabi and Barah are the other municipalities. This Inaruwa Municipality has become a municipality from the Panchayat in the year 2047 BS. Being headquarter of Sunsari district, It homes all district offices like District court, District administrative office, Malpot Karyalaya , Department of Measurement .

History

Before Annexation in Nepal
In Vedic Period , Sunsari was part of Mithila region along with Jhapa and Morang.
Later in 18 th century, King Mawrong Hang annexed them all into Limbuwan.Also, Meanwhile Gorkha King Prithivi Narayan Shah was on a campaign to conquer all the hill kingdoms into his Empire. He attacked Limbuwan on two fronts. After the Limbuwan Gorkha War 1771-1774 AD, the Limbu ministers of Morang, and Limbu rulers of the ten principalities came to an agreement with the King of Gorkha. With the Limbuwan Gorkha treaty of 1774, Limbuwan was annexed to Nepal.& Hence , It was formed as part of Nepal.

After Anexation in Nepal
During the reign of Bhim shumsher , this land, which has been a forest for thousands of years, is inhabited by slopes , trees, forest. The aim to increase the agricultural production of the two settlements. As the number of Nepali people moving to big cities for settlements including Sikkim, Bhutan, Burma and Assam in India without finding employment in the country, the deforestation work started in the year 1988, acknowledging the importance of manpower in the country. Although the area has been a densely forested area for thousands of years, a dilapidated dug-out well at the east-north side of the Inaruwa Hospital has now become public.
Even after that, the robbers from India were lurking in the same dug wells all day and night, and even hiding in the forest. Later, during deforestation, everyone saw that well as a 'remnant'. Inaruwa seems to be a meaningful place. This is why Inaruwa is often called Inaruwa (also Inarwa) by the Maithili, Tharauti and Bhojpuri speaking people of Terai.

Religious places
Religious places in the municipality include:
Satyanarayan Mandir , Inaruwa 1
Ram Janaki Mandir , Inaruwa 7
Maa Bhagwati Mandir, Inaruwa 1
Shiv Mandir , Inaruwa 1
Maa Durga Mandir , Inaruwa 2
Radha Krishna Mandir, Inaruwa 3

Hanuman Mandir, Inaruwa 4
Latidevi Than , Inaruwa 5
Jama masjid, Inaruwa 4
LaxmiNarayan Mandir, Inaruwa 2

Administration

A municipality in Nepal is an administrative division in the Provinces of Nepal .It functions as a sub-unit of a district.

Mayor - Kedar Bhandari
Deputy Mayor - Binita Mehta
Ward Chairman 
Ward 1 - Pramod Pokhrel
Ward 2 - Bishwanath Thakur
Ward 3 - Ramesh Kumar shrestha
Ward 4 - Bauwalal Mehta
Ward 5 - Anil Kumar Pokhrel
Ward 6 - Suman Thapa
Ward 7 - Himmat Singh Khawas
Ward 8 - Ashok Kumar sahu Teli
Ward 9 - Wasir muddin Mansuri
Ward 10 - MD. Khalil Aktar  

 

Head Officer - Dasrath Rai
Administration , Plan and Monitoring - Kapildev Mehta
Information and Communication officer - Niraj Pokhrel
Administration  planning and Monitoring - Bhagwat Mehta
Jinsi - Kumar Niraula 
Finance Officer -Ashok Mehta
Revenue Dept. - Kumari Bhattarai
Infrastructure Development and Management - Er. Umeshwor Mehta
Building and housing -Er.  Sanjay Mehta
Disaster management - Binod Bhattarai
Vehicle - Geeta Kumari Subedi
City Police - Hukumdhwaj Karki
Health care department - Kapleshwor Shah
Education, Youth & sports - Dilliraj Niraula
Economic development - Jeevan Kumar Bhattarai
Law department - Baburam Bhattarai
Bold names are Adhikrit

Geography
Inaruwa lies eastern part of Nepal . It covers 77.92 km² area , sharing boundaries with Ramdhuni Municipality, Harinagar gaupalika, gadhi gaupalika, Itahari sub-metropolitan. It has 10 wards.
Geographically, it is terai with connecting various places. Inaruwa has prennial rivers like sunsari river . 

The more aesthetic beauty is added by greenery in lands as majority depends on agriculture. The plane terai levels at 75 m (approx) and is  rich in fertility of soil.

Demographics

Census 2011
As of 2011 Inaruwa Municipality had a population of 63,593 population, with 31,195 males and 32,398 females. Ward 9 had the highest population of 8,526, and ward 5 had lowest population with 8,526.

In the same year, Inaruwa had 13,020 households, with the highest number of 1,721 in ward 3, and the lowest number of 1,066 in ward 10.

Languages

Religion

Preliminary census 2021
According to the preliminary report of the 2021 census, the total number of families is 16931, the total population is 75,932, out of which there are 37,273 males and 38,647 females, with a sex ratio of 0.964 (M/F).

Health care 

Inaruwa also boasts of a state-of-the-art hospital that provides 24-hour emergency services to its residents. The hospital is staffed with a team of highly skilled and experienced medical professionals who specialize in a wide range of human healthcare services. The hospital also collaborates with various government programs to provide free health care services to the local community, such as health campaigns in each ward. Additionally, the hospital also offers services under health insurance policies, making quality healthcare accessible to a wider range of individuals. To further enhance the accessibility of healthcare services, each ward of Inaruwa is also equipped with Health Posts that provide primary care services to the local residents.

Sports
Inaruwa has stadium located behind district hospital. Inaruwa is hub for sports like volleyball, football, cricket and many more.

 The town hosts national-level sports and tournaments every year, and has hosted many sport tournaments, mainly cricket and football, including the President Gold Cup, Mayor cup, Manmohan Smirti Cup, and Sunsari Premier League. It has hosted Nepal's first night Cricket too. Numbers of night volleyball has been organised annually.Also President Cup is organised in the stadium.

Transportation
Inaruwa is a city located in the fertile plain of Nepal. It is situated on the Mahendra Highway, which acts as a major transport hub connecting the city to surrounding villages, as well as the larger cities of Itahari, Biratnagar, and Jhumka. The city has well-maintained roadways, making it easily accessible by car or bus.
The nearest airport to Inaruwa is Biratnagar Airport, located 25.4 km (15.8 mi) away.

In addition to the Mahendra Highway, Inaruwa also has roadways that link it to the Indian border via Dewangunj and Bhutaha. Furthermore, the city has a newly built bus station that provides links to Prakashpur, Bhutaha and other junctions on the Mahendra Highway. This makes Inaruwa an important transportation hub for the region, connecting people and goods to various destinations.

Media 

Inaruwa has numerous local newspaper publications , Radio stations as well as provided by all national newspapers, televisios . Daily newspapers like  Pratikchhan daily  , Radio stations like Popular FM , Advance FM , National daily newspapers like  The Kathmandu post, The Himalayan Times , The Annapurna post  , all TV channels like kantipur television   , Galaxy News , Prime News etc. Provide services . Also , few of them provide e- News services via Facebook, Twitter.

Education 
Inaruwa has 68 educational institutions, including playgroup, primary, secondary and higher education up to masters degree level. Inaruwa has six colleges for undergraduate and postgraduate education. It has a 60.54% literacy rate. Also, a few primary public schools have initiated English-medium education.

According to latest data as published by Inaruwa municipality,  27 public schools with highly appreciated technology like E-attendance and Wi-fi. All schools follows annual calendar and plans , policies.

Few schools names are :

Bal Mandir School

Saraswati higher secondary school

Rajajee Ramjee mahato(Dash)Secondary School 

Janta secondary school

Sharada secondary school

Sunsari Multiple Campus

Mayors

Economic Activities 
The major economic activities in Inaruwa are Agriculture , Local business,  livestock, poultry , Milk,  Mineral water  production , Rice production.

Climate

Summer season (mar-Jun) is quite hot and wet . Temperature here, reaches Upto 35-38°C 

winter season,(Dec-Feb) of Inaruwa is cold and dry temperature decreases Upto 8-9 °C.

In July-September , It receives heavy rainfall . About 2007 mm of precipitation falls annually. There is 4 mm of precipitation in December. In July, the precipitation reaches its peak, with an average of 571 mm.

2022

References

External links

Populated places in Sunsari District
Municipalities in Koshi Province
Nepal municipalities established in 1986
Municipalities in Sunsari District
 cities in Nepal